Flitwick is a town and civil parish in Bedfordshire, England.
It is mentioned in the Domesday Book of 1086 as "a hamlet on the River Flitt". The spelling Flytwyk appears in 1381.

The nearby River Flit runs through Flitwick Moor, a nature reserve and a Site of Special Scientific Interest.

Location

It is broadly equidistant between Bedford  and Luton . It shares many services with the neighbouring town of Ampthill, which lies just to the north.  The boundary between the two towns is a watercourse called the Running Waters, which is now the route of the A507.

Nearby settlements

Ampthill, Maulden, Clophill, Flitton, Greenfield, Steppingley, Pulloxhill, Westoning, Harlington, Barton le Clay, Tingrith, Eversholt, Millbrook

Shopping

Flitwick has seen a large expansion in its population in recent years, but its retail facilities have not kept up with this growth. The local council has drawn up plans to redevelop the town centre to improve its retail offering . At present, it has a Tesco, a Barclays bank, a Co-op, which provides a secondary food source to the community and many smaller shops and estate agents, many in close proximity to the railway station. There is an open-air market every Friday selling local produce, which is set up on the car park of the village hall. The open-air market has a variety of stalls such as fishmongers, baker, haberdashery, and fruit and vegetables.

Flitwick market currently experiencing new stalls, including butcher and Thai food.

Leisure

There is a sports centre with a 25-metre swimming pool with kids' pool attached. The leisure centre also has a gym, squash courts with leagues, and a gymnasium. A new leisure centre was built for opening in early March 2015. The previous leisure site was earmarked by Central Beds Council for downsizing and over-55s' assisted living accommodation.

Flitwick Town Council own and operate from The Rufus Centre on the outskirts of the town on Steppingley Road. The Centre is also a busy conference and special event venue with office space to lease.

Flitwick has four public houses: the Crown, the Swan, the Bumble Bee, and the Blackbirds. The Blackbirds is a 17th-century building with a large beer garden and children's play area.  The pub formerly known as the Wheatsheaf re-opened as an Indian restaurant called the Indian Lodge. A membership-operated social club, The Flitwick Club, is situated on The High Street, opposite the Drivestyle yard.

Center Parcs Woburn Forest opened in July 2014 on the outskirts of Flitwick at Warren Wood.

Haunted Wood: During the COVID-19 pandemic a haunted wood was created in Flitwick woods. After the first one was stolen, a 3-day event called Spookfest was installed over a period of 4 weeks, which provided entertainment for all the family on their daily walk.

Transport

Road

Bus

The main bus services are as follows:

42 (Grant Palmer) provides an hourly daytime service Mondays to Saturdays providing a connection to: Westoning, Harlington, Toddington, Ampthill, Houghton Conquest, and Bedford.  Mondays to Saturdays – no Sunday service.

2 (Stagecoach) provides an hourly daytime service Mondays to Saturdays to Ampthill,   Kempston and Bedford.  Mondays to Saturdays – no Sunday service.

44 (Grant Palmer) Bedford via A6 to Bedford, Wilstead, Flitwick, Silsoe (Monday - Friday Only)

200 (Grant Palmer) provides a two hourly service to Ampthill, Shefford, Clifton and Biggleswade.  Mondays to Fridays only.

34 (Grant Palmer) Milton Keynes

Rail

Flitwick has a station on the Thameslink line (First Capital Connect took over the franchise on 1 April 2006, taken over again on 14 September 2014 by Govia Thameslink Railway). Trains go north to Bedford and south to Luton, St Albans, London, Gatwick Airport, Three Bridges, East Grinstead, and Brighton making it a popular place to live for commuters.

Schools

Flitwick has three lower schools (Kingsmoor, Templefield and Flitwick Lower School), a middle school (Woodland Middle School Academy). The old Flitwick School has been refurbished from its earlier state of neglect, and now serves as a further community centre, youth club and toddler group.

Sport

It has four football teams: Flitwick Town, who play in the Bedfordshire County League Premier Division, Flitwick Ladies, who play in the Bedfordshire & Hertfordshire Women's First Division, Flitwick Eagles, and Dinamo Flitwick.
It is also home to Flitwick Cricket Club (The Otters) which has over 50 adult playing members and 160 Colts.

Landmarks

Flitwick is known for its Flitwick Manor House, currently used as a hotel and restaurant.

There is also physical evidence of a Norman fortification, Flitwick Castle, locally known as "The Mount".

The medieval Church of St Peter & St Paul is the parish church, located in the town.

Land at Clay Hill, near Flitwick, serves as one of the UK's first subsidy-free solar farms, and is operated by Gridserve. It came online in 2017 and comprises 10MW of bifacial solar cells and 6MW of energy storage.

Notable people 
 Henry John Sylvester Stannard RBA FRSA (12 July 1870 – 21 January 1951), British watercolour artist whose patrons included the British Royal Family.
 Michael Crowther, prominent American wildlife conservationist and founder of the Indianapolis Prize, grew up in Flitwick, living there from age 4 until age 17. He attended Flitwick Primary School and Bedford Modern School.
 Brian Stein, former Luton Town professional footballer, lives in Flitwick.
 Malcolm Wynn, former English cricketer, was born in the town
 Russell Howard, famed west country stand up comedian lived in Flitwick for a few years when he attended Bedford Modern School. He was not a fan.

References

External links

 Flitwick Town Council

 
Towns in Bedfordshire
Civil parishes in Bedfordshire
Central Bedfordshire District